The governor of Nueva Vizcaya, is the chief executive of the provincial government of Nueva Vizcaya.

Provincial Governors (1917-2025)

There have been twenty (20) provincial governors of Nueva Vizcaya since its reorganization in 1917.

References

Governors of Nueva Vizcaya
Nueva Vizcaya